"Sleepless" is a song performed by Swedish singer Eric Saade. It is the first single from Saade's first album, Masquerade, and was released on 21 December 2009 worldwide. It reached the top 50 in Sweden.

Charts

Release history

References

External links
Eric Saade Official Website

2009 songs
Eric Saade songs
Songs written by Fredrik Kempe
Songs written by Peter Boström
2009 debut singles
Roxy Recordings singles